Carolyn "Carrie" Quigley (born 22 June 1970 in Adelaide) is an Australian sport shooter. She was a gold medallist in the sport rifle prone pairs and silver medallist in the sport rifle prone events at the 1998 Commonwealth Games in Kuala Lumpur and placed 39th in the women's 50 metre rifle three positions event at the 2000 Summer Olympics.

References

1970 births
Living people
ISSF rifle shooters
Australian female sport shooters
Olympic shooters of Australia
Shooters at the 2000 Summer Olympics
Commonwealth Games medallists in shooting
Commonwealth Games gold medallists for Australia
Commonwealth Games silver medallists for Australia
Shooters at the 1998 Commonwealth Games
20th-century Australian women
21st-century Australian women
Medallists at the 1998 Commonwealth Games